Lycium afrum, the kraal honey thorn (Afrikaans: kraalkriedoring) is a shrub in the potato family (Solanaceae). The species is native to the Cape Province in South Africa. It has appeared in Australia and is regarded with some concern as possibly invasive. Australian government factsheets remark that in Australia it is an uncommon hedge plant, sparingly naturalised in a few areas in Victoria.

Description 

Its leaves are leathery and tufted on short shoots.

The fruit is a subspherical berry, red when ripe, eaten by birds.

It is not clear how safe it is to eat the fruit, though berries of some species of Lycium certainly are eaten with impunity by humans and animals.

References

afrum